In & Out is a 1997 American comedy film directed by Frank Oz and starring Kevin Kline, Tom Selleck, Joan Cusack, Matt Dillon, Debbie Reynolds, Bob Newhart, Shalom Harlow, and Wilford Brimley. It is an original story by screenwriter Paul Rudnick. Joan Cusack was nominated for an Academy Award for Best Supporting Actress for her performance.

The film was inspired by Tom Hanks's tearful speech when he accepted his 1994 Oscar (for his role in Philadelphia), in which he mentioned his high-school drama coach Rawley Farnsworth, and his former classmate John Gilkerson, "two of the finest gay Americans, two wonderful men that I had the good fortune to be associated with." The film became one of mainstream Hollywood's few attempts at a comedic "gay movie" of its era, and was widely noted at the time for a 12-second kiss between Kevin Kline and Tom Selleck.

Plot
Howard Brackett is a well-liked English literature teacher, living a quiet life in the fictional town of Greenleaf, Indiana, with his fiancée and fellow teacher Emily Montgomery, who recently lost 75 pounds. 

The town is filled with anticipation over the nomination of Howard's former student Cameron Drake in the Best Actor category at the Academy Awards for his portrayal of a gay soldier in To Serve and Protect. Cameron does indeed win the award and, in his acceptance speech, thanks Howard, adding, ". . . and he's gay."

Howard's family, friends, students, co-workers and Emily are shocked; but that is nothing compared to Howard's own reaction of disbelief and indignation. He angrily reassures those who know him that he is heterosexual. Reporters invade his hometown and harass him for interviews following the awards night telecast. Howard is placed under the scrutiny of his boss, Principal Tom Halliwell, who is uncomfortable with the attention being brought to the school.

Although the other reporters leave after getting their story, one stays behind: on-camera entertainment reporter Peter Malloy, who wants to wait the week out so he can cover Howard's wedding to Emily. Howard continues to be harassed and dismayed by the changed attitudes of everyone around him, and decides that he must sleep with Emily in order to prove his heterosexuality. Howard finds he cannot go through with it due to his conflicting emotions and Emily's concern for his well-being. 

Howard crosses paths with Peter, who reveals he is gay and, trying to provide a helpful ear, narrates his own experience in coming out to his family. Howard insists that he is not gay, prompting Peter to kiss him. Although shocked, he reacts somewhat positively to the kiss.

Howard's final measure to restore his heterosexuality is the use of a self-help audio cassette, although that fails as well. During the wedding ceremony, Emily recites her vow without hesitation, but when Howard is prompted by the minister, he instead says, "I'm gay." The wedding is called off, and although Peter is proud of him, he is angry with himself for hurting Emily. 

Howard is fired from the school because of his coming out. Despite no longer being on the faculty, He is allowed to attend the graduation ceremony to support his students and sits on stage with his former co-workers. Having learned of the ensuing media blitz while in Los Angeles, Cameron flies to his hometown with his supermodel girlfriend and shows up at the ceremony. 

When Cameron learns that his former teacher became ineligible for the "Teacher of the Year" award due to being dismissed for being gay, he publicly questions if the reason given, that the community would not have supported Howard's continued employment, is valid. Spurred on by this, when one student who got into college—thanks to Howard's hard work—proclaims himself to be gay, his classmates join him to proclaim themselves to be gay as well, showing their support. Howard's family follows suit, as do his friends, and all the townsfolk assembled. Although Howard does not win "Teacher of the Year", Cameron presents him with his Oscar to the cheers of the crowd.

Howard's wedding-crazy mother finally gets a wedding—her own, when she and her husband renew their vows. Howard, Peter and the rest of the townsfolk attend the reception. Among the crowd are Emily and Cameron, who appear to have begun a relationship. Everyone dances to the Village People song "Macho Man".

Cast

 Kevin Kline as Howard Brackett
 Tom Selleck as Peter Malloy
 Joan Cusack as Emily Montgomery
 Matt Dillon as Cameron Drake
 Debbie Reynolds as Bernice Brackett
 Wilford Brimley as Frank Brackett
 Gregory Jbara as Walter Brackett
 Shalom Harlow as Sonya
 Shawn Hatosy as Jack
 Zak Orth as Mike
 Bob Newhart as Tom Halliwell
 Lauren Ambrose as Vicky
 Alexandra Holden as Meredith
 Deborah Rush as Ava Blazer
 Lewis J. Stadlen as Edward Kenrow
 J. Smith-Cameron as Trina Paxton
 Kate McGregor-Stewart as Aunt Becky
 Debra Monk as Mrs. Lester
 Ernie Sabella as Aldo Hooper
 John Cunningham as the Voice on "Be a Man" Tape
 Gus Rogerson as Danny
 Dan Hedaya as a Military Attorney
 Joseph Maher as Father Tim
 William Parry as Fred Mooney
 William Duell as Emmett Wilson
 Richard Woods as Revered Morgan
 Kevin Chamberlin as Carl Mickley
 Wally Dunn as Cousin Lenny
 Larry Clarke as Cousin Ernie
 June Squibb as Cousin Ellen
 Becky Ann Baker as Darlene
 Selma Blair as Cousin Linda
 Adam LeFerve and Bill Camp as Bachelor Party Guests
 Whoopi Goldberg as Herself
 Glenn Close as Herself
 Jay Leno as Himself

Production
According to Frank Oz, production had to be stopped temporarily because "we all got sick...because we all got the flu."  Oz and Wilford Brimley reportedly did not get along during production, however neither of them have ever elaborated on what caused the friction between the two.

Selected for its "beautiful auditorium, a great gymnasium" and other aesthetic qualities, the Pompton Lakes High School in Pompton Lakes, New Jersey was used extensively as a filming location for In & Out.

Soundtrack

At first, Frank Oz asked Miles Goodman to do the music for In & Out. Goodman, who composed several of Oz's previous films, died before he could do so.

A soundtrack was released on Tuesday, September 23, 1997, featuring previously recorded songs as well as Marc Shaiman's instrumental music composed for the film.

 "I Will Survive" - Diana Ross
 "Wedding Preparations" (instrumental)
 "Everything's Coming up Roses" - Ethel Merman
 "'To Serve and Protect'" (instrumental)
 "Howard Is Outed" (instrumental)
 "The Morning After" (instrumental)
 "The Bachelor Party" (instrumental)
 "Interviews with Townsfolk" (instrumental)
 "Homosection" (instrumental)
 "I Don't" (instrumental)
 "Mom & Dad" (instrumental)
 "Cameron & Emily" (instrumental)
 "Crazy" - Patsy Cline
 "Teacher of the Year/People/The Wedding" (instrumental)
 "Macho Man" - Village People

Release

Critical reception
In & Out was well received by critics. The performances were widely praised, especially Cusack, who eventually earned an Oscar nod, and Kline. The film also gained attention for depicting homosexuality in a "mainstream" comedy about "Middle America" which, Rita Kempley Howe wrote in The Washington Post, "manages to simultaneously flaunt and flout gay stereotypes." Critics also noted its generally asexual treatment of homosexuality: Janet Maslin commented in The New York Times that the film is not one "to associate gayness with actual sex," while TV Guide quipped that it "finally gets discussion about gay people out of the bedroom and into the record store." Despite generally positive reviews, several critics, even those who were complimentary, felt that the ending was weak and did not live up to the rest of the film.

The film has a 73% approval rating on Rotten Tomatoes based on 55 reviews, with an average rating of 6.8/10; the site's consensus states: "It doesn't always find comfortable ground between broad comedy and social commentary, but lively performances—especially from Kevin Kline and Joan Cusack—enrich In & Outs mixture of laughs and sexual tolerance." On Metacritic the film has a rating of 70 based on reviews from 18 critics.

Accolades

American Film Institute recognition:
 AFI's 100 Years... 100 Laughs – Nominated

Box office
The film did well at the box office, grossing $15,019,821 in its opening weekend and $63,856,929 over its entire theatrical run.

Home media
In & Out was released on Region 1 DVD on October 21, 1998. The release does not include any extras besides the theatrical trailer. The Region 2 DVD was released on April 9, 2001. The film received a new 4K remaster and was released on Blu-ray on 1 June 2021 in the United States and is currently available on iTunes in 4K with Dolby Vision HDR.

See also 
List of LGBT-related films

References

External links
 
 
 
 
 

1997 films
1997 comedy films
American comedy films
1997 LGBT-related films
American LGBT-related films
1990s English-language films
Films about educators
Films about weddings
Films directed by Frank Oz
Films set in 1997
Films set in Indiana
Films shot in New Jersey
Films shot in New York (state)
Gay-related films
LGBT-related comedy films
Paramount Pictures films
Films produced by Scott Rudin
Films scored by Marc Shaiman
Spelling Films films
Films with screenplays by Paul Rudnick
Homophobia in fiction
Films about anti-LGBT sentiment
1990s American films